Edward Beers Thomas (August 4, 1848 – March 27, 1929) was a United States district judge of the United States District Court for the Eastern District of New York.

Education and career

Born on August 4, 1848, in Cortland, New York, Thomas received an Artium Baccalaureus degree in 1870 from Yale University. He entered private practice in New York. He was a member of the New York State Senate from 1881 to 1885. He was elected from New York's 24th Senate District, sitting in the 105th, 106th, 107th and 108th New York State Legislatures. At the New York state election, 1885, he ran on the Republican ticket for New York Attorney General but was defeated by the incumbent Democrat Denis O'Brien.

Federal judge

Thomas was nominated by President William McKinley on February 7, 1898, to a seat on the United States District Court for the Eastern District of New York vacated by Judge Asa Wentworth Tenney. He was confirmed by the United States Senate on February 15, 1898, and received his commission the same day. His service terminated on December 31, 1906, due to his resignation.

Later career and death

Following his resignation from the federal bench, Thomas served as a Justice of the Supreme Court of New York for the Second Judicial District from 1907 to 1918. He died on March 27, 1929, in Brooklyn, New York.

References

Sources
 

Judges of the United States District Court for the Eastern District of New York
United States federal judges appointed by William McKinley
1848 births
1929 deaths
People from Cortland, New York
People from Brooklyn
New York (state) state senators